The kidnapping and murder of Hanns Martin Schleyer marked the end of the German Autumn in 1977.

German industrial leader and former SS member Hanns Martin Schleyer was kidnapped on 5 September 1977, by the Red Army Faction (RAF), also known as Baader-Meinhof Gang, in Cologne, West Germany. It was intended to force the West German government to release Andreas Baader and three other RAF members being held at the Stammheim Prison near the city of Stuttgart. On 18 October 1977, on learning that three of their members had died in prison, the RAF killed Martin Schleyer.

Events

Kidnapping
Schleyer's abduction was planned by Siegfried Haag, but he was arrested in 1976, so his replacement, Brigitte Mohnhaupt, carried out the abduction.

On 5 September 1977, an RAF “commando unit” attacked the chauffeured car carrying Schleyer, then president of the German employers' association, in Cologne, just after the car had turned right from Friedrich Schmidt Strasse into Vincenz-Statz Strasse. His driver, Heinz Marcisz, 41, was forced to brake when a baby carriage suddenly appeared in the street in front of them. The police escort vehicle behind them was unable to stop in time, and crashed into Schleyer's car. Four (or possibly five) masked RAF members then jumped out and sprayed machine gun and machine pistol bullets into the two vehicles, killing Marcisz and a police officer, Roland Pieler, 20, who was seated in the backseat of Marcisz's car. The driver of the police escort vehicle, Reinhold Brändle, 41 and a third police officer, Helmut Ulmer, 24, who was in the second vehicle were also killed. The hail of bullets riddled over twenty bullet wounds into the bodies of Brändle and Pieler. Schleyer was then pulled out of the car and forced into the RAF assailants' own getaway van.

Imprisonment and killing
Schleyer was hidden in a highrise in Erftstadt (Liblar) near Cologne. The police came very close to finding him, but due to lack of internal communication could not rescue him. Several local police officers were convinced that Schleyer was held in the aforementioned highrise close to the autobahn. One investigator had rung the doorbell of the apartment in question, but nobody had conveyed this information to the crisis center of the federal police.

The RAF demanded that the government release imprisoned members of their group. The government refused to give into RAF's demands or negotiate. The RAF sent the government a picture of Schleyer alive, in captivity, on 8 October 1977.

After 43 days, the government had not given in to the demands of the kidnappers. Hours after the German counterterrorism unit GSG 9 ended the Palestinian hijack of Lufthansa Flight 181, the imprisoned RAF members Baader, Gudrun Ensslin and Jan-Carl Raspe were found dead in their prison cells. 

After Schleyer's kidnappers received the news of the death of their imprisoned comrades, Schleyer was taken from Brussels, Belgium on 18 October 1977, and shot dead en route to Mulhouse, France, where his body was left in the trunk of a green Audi 100 on the rue Charles Péguy.

Investigation
On 9 September 2007, former RAF member Peter-Jürgen Boock mentioned that the RAF members Rolf Heissler and Stefan Wisniewski were responsible for Schleyer's death.

Schleyer's widow, Waltrude Schleyer, campaigned against clemency for his kidnappers and other members of the RAF. She died on 21 March 2008, in Stuttgart.

References

1977 murders in Germany
1977 murders in France
1977 in international relations
1977 mass shootings in Europe
1970s in Cologne
20th-century mass murder in Germany
Assassinations in France
Cold War history of France
Cold War history of Germany
Crime in Cologne
Crime in Grand Est
Deaths by firearm in France
Deaths by person in France
Kidnapping in the 1970s
Kidnappings in Germany
Mass murder in 1977
Mass shootings in Germany
Murder in North Rhine-Westphalia
October 1977 crimes
October 1977 events in Europe
Red Army Faction
September 1977 crimes
September 1977 events in Europe
Terrorist incidents in France in 1977
Terrorist incidents in Germany in 1977
Terrorist incidents in North Rhine-Westphalia
1977 crimes in France